Hodges may refer to:

People and fictional characters
 Hodges (surname)

Places
 Hodges Drive, a main west–east road in Joondalup, north of Perth, Western Australia
 Hodges Glacier, a small glacier one nautical mile west of Grytviken, South Georgia, Antarctica
 Hodges Point, a rocky point six nautical miles east-northeast of Cape Northrop
 Hodges, Jamaica, a small hamlet in Saint Elizabeth, Jamaica
 Mount Hodges, a mountain on the Thatcher Peninsula, Antarctica

United States
 Hodges Township, Stevens County, Minnesota
 Hodges, Alabama, a town in Franklin County, Alabama
 Hodges, South Carolina, a town in Greenwood County, South Carolina
 Hodges, West Virginia, an unincorporated community in Cabell County, West Virginia
 Lake Hodges, a lake and reservoir located in Southern California

Historic houses
United States
 Hodges House (Bismarck, Arkansas)
 Hodges House (Carrollton, Illinois)
 Hodges House (Taunton, Massachusetts)

Other
 , a Rudderow-class destroyer escort in the United States Navy during World War II
 Hodges baronets, a title in the Baronetage of England. United Kingdom
 Hodges Coaches, a family owned coach operator based in Sandhurst, Berkshire, United Kingdom
 Hodges Stadium, a multi-purpose stadium at the University of North Florida, United States
 Hodges University, a private university in Naples, Florida, United States

See also
 Hodge (disambiguation)